Linderoth is a Swedish surname. Notable people with the surname include:

Anders Linderoth (born 1950), Swedish footballer and manager
Betty Linderoth (1822–1900), Swedish watchmaker
Tobias Linderoth (born 1979), Swedish footballer

Swedish-language surnames